The tallest buildings in Argentina are primarily residential and most of them were completed after 2000, with some notable exceptions being the Kavanagh Building, an Art Deco skyscraper completed in 1936, and the Alas Building, commissioned by President Juan Perón in 1950 and completed in the late 1950s.

Almost all of the country's high-rise buildings are located in Buenos Aires, the Argentine capital city and a major metropolitan area in South America. Within Buenos Aires, the Dock 3 of Puerto Madero has been the site for most of Argentina's tallest skyscrapers. Tall buildings have also emerged at the Dock 1, where is currently under construction the 198-metre (649 ft) tall Harbour Tower, set to be completed in 2024 as the second tallest in Argentina.

Completed
This includes spires and architectural details but does not include antenna masts. An equal sign (=) following a rank indicates the same height between two or more buildings. The "Year" column indicates the year in which a building was completed.

Under construction
This lists buildings that are under construction in Argentina and are planned to rise at least .

Proposed
This lists buildings that are proposed for construction in Argentina and are planned to rise at least .

See also
List of tallest buildings in Buenos Aires
List of tallest buildings in South America

References

External links

Tallest